HMS Precise (Z285) was a net laying ship for the Royal Navy during the Second World War acquired from the United States Navy in December 1944 via Lend-Lease.

On 17 January 1944, while still under construction, the ship was reclassified as a net laying ship and redesignated AN-74. Boxelder was launched on 20 July and completed on 19 December.

After delivery to the U.S. Navy on 21 December, she was transferred to the United Kingdom under Lend-Lease the same day and commissioned into the Royal Navy as HMS Precise (Z285). Upon completion of wartime duty with the United Kingdom, she was returned to the U.S. Navy on 14 December 1945. Struck from the Naval Vessel Register on 28 March 1946, she was transferred to the United States Maritime Commission on 10 April 1947 and sold.

References 
 
 YN-80 / AN-74 Boxelder, HMS Precise (Z-285)

 

Ailanthus-class boom defence vessels of the Royal Navy
Ships built in New Bern, North Carolina
1944 ships
World War II net laying ships